James Toon may refer to:
 James Toon (American football) (1938–2011), American gridiron football player and coach
 James Toon (cricketer) (1916–1987), English cricketer